Monroe or Monroes may refer to:

People and fictional characters
 Monroe (surname)
 Monroe (given name)
 James Monroe, 5th President of the United States

Places

United States
 Monroe, Arkansas, an unincorporated community and census-designated place
 Monroe, California, former name of Hales Grove, California
 Fort Monroe (Yosemite), California, a historic site
 Monroe, Connecticut, a town
 Monroe County, Florida
 Lake Monroe (Florida)
 Monroe, Georgia, a city
 Monroe, Adams County, Indiana, a town
 Monroe, Tippecanoe County, Indiana, an unincorporated community
 Lake Monroe (Indiana), a reservoir
 Monroe, Iowa, a city
 Monroe, Kentucky, an unincorporated community
 Monroe, Louisiana, a city
 Monroe, Maine, a town
 Monroe, Massachusetts, a town
 Monroe, Michigan, a city
 Lake Monroe (Mississippi), Monroe County, Mississippi
 Monroe Island, in the Yellowstone River in Montana
 Monroe, Nebraska, a village
 Monroe, New Hampshire a town
 Mount Monroe, a peak in the White Mountains of New Hampshire
 Monroe, New York, a town
 Monroe (village), New York, in the town of Monroe
 Monroe, North Carolina, a city
 Monroe, Ohio, a city
 Monroe, Jackson County, Ohio, an unincorporated community
 Monroe, Oklahoma, an unincorporated community and census-designated place
 Monroe, Oregon, a city
 Monroe, Pennsylvania, a borough
 Monroe, South Dakota, a town
 Monroe, Tennessee, an unincorporated community
 Monroe, Utah, a city
 Monroe, Virginia, an unincorporated community
 Fort Monroe, Hampton, Virginia, a former military installation
 Monroe Park, Richmond, Virginia
 Monroe Bay, Virginia
 Monroe, Washington, a city
 Monroe, Adams County, Wisconsin, a town
 Monroe (town), Green County, Wisconsin, a town
 Monroe, Wisconsin, a city partially within the town of Monroe
 Monroe Township (disambiguation)

Elsewhere 
 Monroe Island, South Orkney Islands, Antarctica
 Monroe Point, South Shetland Islands, Antarctica
 Monroe, Newfoundland and Labrador, Canada, a settlement
 Monroe, County Westmeath, Ireland, a townland
 3768 Monroe, an asteroid

Arts and entertainment

Television
 Monroe (TV series), a British medical drama series
 The Monroes (1966 TV series), an American Western series
 The Monroes (1995 TV series), an American prime-time soap opera

Music
 The Monroes (American band), a 1980s New Wave pop band
 The Monroes (Norwegian band), a 1980s pop/ska duo

Other arts and entertainment
 For fictional characters, see Monroe (given name) and Monroe (surname).
 Monroe (comic strip), a comic strip published in Mad Magazine
 Monroe Republic, an area of the US in the television series Revolution

Schools
 Monroe College, a former name of Tift College, a private liberal arts women's college located in Forsyth, Georgia
 Monroe College, an American for-profit college based in New York
 Monroe School (Phoenix, Arizona), a former school on the National Register of Historic Places
 Monroe School (Sandusky, Ohio), on the National Register of Historic Places in Sandusky, Ohio
 Monroe High School (disambiguation)
 Monroe Elementary School (disambiguation)

Transportation
 Monroe (automobile), a vintage American automobile of the Brass Era
 , a steamship
 Monroe Airport (disambiguation)
 Monroe Expressway, North Carolina
 Monroe Railroad (disambiguation)
 Monroe station (disambiguation)

Other uses
 Monroe (tree), a giant sequoia in the Gian Forest, California
 Monroe Correctional Complex, Monroe, Washington, United States
 Monroe (avocado), a commercial avocado cultivar
 Monroe Calculating Machine Company, an American calculator company
 Monroe, a division of the Tenneco corporation
 Monroe piercing, body piercing of the upper lip area
 Palácio Monroe, a former building in Rio de Janeiro

See also

 
 
 
 Monroe Doctrine, a United States policy of opposing European colonialism in the Americas
 Monroe Center (disambiguation)
 Monroe City (disambiguation)
 Monroe County (disambiguation)
 Monroeville (disambiguation)
 Monro (disambiguation)
 Munro (disambiguation)
 Munroe (disambiguation)